Arcadian may refer to:

 Arcadian, someone or something from, or related to:
 Arcadia (region), the ancient Greek region
 Arcadia (regional unit), the region in modern Greece
 Accademia degli Arcadi, the Italian literary academy founded in Rome
any of the other places known as "Arcadia"
 Arcadian Greek, the dialect spoken in ancient Arcadia
 Arcadian ecology, an environmentalist perspective
 Bebearia arcadius, a butterfly in the family Nymphalidae

Arts and entertainment
 Arcadian (Star Trek), a race in Star Trek
 The Arcadian, an American science fiction film
 , a Franco-Swiss band

Ships
 SS Arcadian, formerly the 1899 ship, SS Ortona, she was torpedoed and sunk in 1917
 RMSP Asturias (1907),  renamed RMSP Arcadian in 1923 and scrapped in 1933
 HMS Arcadian, a projected Amphion-class submarine, the order for which was cancelled in 1945

See also
 Arcadia (disambiguation)
 Arcadians (disambiguation)
 Acadian, Cajun